The summer solstice, also called the estival solstice or midsummer, occurs when one of Earth's poles has its maximum tilt toward the Sun. It happens twice yearly, once in each hemisphere (Northern and Southern). For that hemisphere, the summer solstice is the day with the longest period of daylight and shortest night of the year, when the Sun is at its highest position in the sky. Within the Arctic circle (for the Northern hemisphere) or Antarctic circle (for the Southern), there is continuous daylight around the summer solstice. The opposite event is the winter solstice.

The summer solstice occurs during summer.  This is the June solstice (usually 20 or 21 June) in the Northern hemisphere and the December solstice (usually 21 or 22 December) in the Southern. On the summer solstice, Earth's maximum axial tilt toward the Sun is 23.44°. Likewise, the Sun's declination from the celestial equator is 23.44°.

Since prehistory, the summer solstice has been seen as a significant time of year in many cultures, and has been marked by festivals and rituals. Traditionally, in many temperate regions (especially Europe), the summer solstice is seen as the middle of summer and referred to as "midsummer"; although today in some countries and calendars it is seen as the beginning of summer.

Distinctions

Although the summer solstice is the longest day of the year for that hemisphere, the dates of earliest sunrise and latest sunset vary by a few days. This is because Earth orbits the Sun in an ellipse, and its orbital speed varies slightly during the year.

Although the Sun appears at its highest altitude from the viewpoint of an observer in outer space or a terrestrial observer outside tropical latitudes, the highest altitude occurs on a different day for certain locations in the tropics, specifically those where the Sun is directly overhead (maximum 90 degrees elevation) at the subsolar point. This day occurs twice each year for all locations between the Tropic of Cancer and Tropic of Capricorn because the overhead Sun appears to cross a given latitude once before the day of the solstice and once afterward. For example, Lahaina Noon occurs in May and July in Hawaii. See solstice article. For all observers, the apparent position of the noon Sun is at its most northerly point on the June solstice and most southerly on the December solstice.

Full moon
The year 2016 was the first time in nearly 70 years that a full moon and the Northern Hemisphere's summer solstice occurred on the same day. The 2016 summer solstice's full moon rose just as the Sun set.

Culture

The significance given to the summer solstice has varied among cultures, but most recognize the event in some way with holidays, festivals, and rituals around that time with themes of religion or fertility. For example, in Sweden, midsummer is one of the year's major holidays when the country closes down as much as during Christmas. In some regions, the summer solstice is seen as the beginning of summer and the end of spring.  In other cultural conventions, the solstice occurs during summer.

Solstice is derived from the Latin words sol (Sun) and sistere (to stand still).

Date

Celebrations 
 Midsummer
 Noc Kupały (Poland)
 Dragon Boat Festival (East Asia)
 Christmas typically marks the southern summer solstice.
 Saint John's Eve or June solstice celebration (Catalan countries)
 Day of Private Reflection (Northern Ireland)
 Jaanipäev (Estonia)
 Juhannus (Finland)
 Jāņi (Latvia)
 Rasos (Lithuania)
 National Indigenous Peoples Day (Canada)
 Tiregān (Iran)

 Fremont Solstice Parade (Fremont, Seattle, Washington, United States)
 Santa Barbara Summer Solstice Parade (Santa Barbara, California,  United States)
 International Surfing Day
 International Yoga Day
 Fête de la Musique, also known as World Music Day

Winter solstice in the Southern Hemisphere
 Inti Raymi, Machu Picchu, Peru
 We Tripantu, (Mapuche, southern Chile)
 Willkakuti, an Andean-Amazonic New Year (Aymara)

Length of the day on northern summer solstice

Length of day increases from the equator towards the North Pole in the Northern Hemisphere in June (around the summer solstice there), but decreases towards the South Pole in the Southern Hemisphere at the time of the southern winter solstice.

See also 
 Daytime
 Stonehenge
 Tekufah
 Xiazhi (Summer solstice in Chinese culture)

References

External links 
 NeoProgrammics - Table of Northern/Southern Solstice Dates/Times From 1600–2400

Time in astronomy
International observances
solstice

de:Sonnenwende#Sommersonnenwende